Coup de Grace is the third studio album by English musician Miles Kane. It was released on 10 August 2018.

Background
Miles Kane started writing the album right after his second solo album Don't Forget Who You Are was released, but became sidetracked when he and Alex Turner resumed their writing partnership for The Last Shadow Puppets's album Everything You've Come to Expect. The songs "Silverscreen", "Coup de Grace" and "Shavambacu" were written in New York. However, according to Kane, he got stuck in a rut while in Los Angeles and "couldn't finish anything" following a break-up. In 2017, he went to an acoustic gig by Jamie T, whom he knew for many years. Afterwards he stayed with Jamie T in a hotel and the two started to write songs together, including "Nothing Changes". The first single from the album, "Loaded", is also written with Jamie T, but became a collaboration with Lana Del Rey when she joined in while it was being written.

Kane recorded the album in Los Angeles with producer John Congleton. The album was recorded in two weeks.

According to Kane, the title Coup de Grace is a reference to the closing move of his favourite WWE wrestler Finn Bálor. Bálor also appears in the music video for "Cry On My Guitar".

Reception

Coup de Grace received mixed reviews from critics upon release. On Metacritic, the album holds a score of 57/100 based on 11 reviews, indicating "mixed or average reviews".

Track listing

Personnel
Credits adapted from album liner notes.

 Miles Kane – vocals, guitar , bass 
 Tyler Parkford – keyboards 
 Zach Dawes – bass 
 Loren Humphrey – drums 
 Jamie T – guitar, bass, drum programming

Charts

References

2018 albums
Miles Kane albums
Virgin EMI Records albums
Albums produced by John Congleton